Lucy Boryer is an American actress. She is best known for her role as Janine Stewart on the comedy-drama series Doogie Howser, M.D. Recurring in the first season; she was promoted as a main cast member in second season until the end of season three. She reprised her role for two additional episodes in the fourth and final season.

Boryer's other television credits are Star Trek: The Next Generation, Major Dad and the ABC Afterschool Special "The Day the Kid Went Punk". She also appeared in the films Zapped Again! (1990), Sleepwalkers (1992), and the television films Body Bags (1993) and In the Line of Duty: The Price of Vengeance (1994).

Filmography

References

External links

20th-century American actresses
American film actresses
American television actresses
Living people
Place of birth missing (living people)
1966 births
21st-century American women